Bonitai or Boneita was a town of ancient Lydia, near Ephesus, inhabited during Roman times.

Its site is located near Küçükkale in Asiatic Turkey.

References

Populated places in ancient Lydia
Former populated places in Turkey
Roman towns and cities in Turkey
History of İzmir Province